TCTS is an English musician

TCTS may also refer to:
TCTS, Trans Canada Telephone System Telecom Canada
TCTS, Tata Communications Transformation Services